Paul Adeolu Adefarasin (born 25 January 1963) is a Nigerian pastor and televangelist. He is the Prelate and Metropolitan Senior Pastor of the House on the Rock church headquartered in Lagos (Nigeria) with branches in several cities across Nigeria including Port-harcourt and Abuja, as well as in Johannesburg, South Africa and London, UK. He is also the Convener/Host of The Experience (gospel concert).

Early life
He was raised in Nigeria and the United States.

Career
Adefarasin attended St Saviour's School in Ikoyi, and Igbobi College in Yaba. His secondary school education was in Haileybury College in England. He went on to study at the University of Miami, graduating with a Bachelor of Architecture. He practiced in Florida before returning to Nigeria.

He studied at the International Bible Institute of London where he received a Diploma in Christian Ministry.

Book publications
Adefarasin has written, authored, and self-published over 20 motivational Christian mini-books and multimedia resources. Three of his books have been published by Christian book publishers and distributors.

Personal life
In June 1995, Adefarasin married Ifeanyi Adefarasin (born September 16th 1972), a former beauty queen and now a respected minister and conference speaker well known for her clear and practical message of hope and empowerment. Together, they have three children.

References

Living people
Nigerian television evangelists
Nigerian Christian writers
Architects from Lagos
Television personalities from Lagos
Place of birth missing (living people)
Paul
Yoruba Christian clergy
Nigerian architects
Yoruba architects
Yoruba television personalities
University of Miami School of Architecture alumni
Nigerian expatriates in the United States
Igbobi College alumni
1963 births